Matthew Edward Duke (4 February 1915 – 12 May 1960) was an American pilot, once married to tobacco heiress Melody Thomson. He eventually turned to making a living off flying anti-Castro Cubans to U.S. exile for $1,000 a job. In May 1960 he was ambushed by police after touching down on Highway 15 west of Havana, and was killed after they opened fire as he attempted to return to the sky.

References

1915 births
1960 deaths
People from Trenton, New Jersey
Cuba–United States relations
United States Naval Aviators
People shot dead by law enforcement officers
Military personnel from New Jersey